Aplysamine-2 is a bio-active isolate of marine sponge.

References

Halogen-containing alkaloids
Bromoarenes
Hydroxylamines
Amides
Methoxy compounds
Dimethylamino compounds